Abutilon otocarpum, the desert lantern, is a small shrub of the family Malvaceae found in most parts of Australia.

Description 
This shrub can grow to 60 cm tall, with flat leaves that alternate up its stem. Leaves of the desert lantern can grow to 1.5 – 6 cm long and are narrow to circular, hairy and toothed. The flowers are yellow, with 5 petals, borne singly on stalks originating at the bases of the leaves, often appearing clustered at the ends of the stems.

The desert lantern differs from dwarf lantern flower (Abutilon fraseri) and plains lantern-bush (Abutilon halophilum) in that the petals are about the same length as the calyx, and from velvetleaf (Abutilon theophrasti) in that the tops of the fruitlets in the fruiting body have very short points.

Cultivation and uses
Growing wild in a range of climates from warm temperate to the tropical zone, it is found particularly in semi-arid areas of the tropics and subtropics. Plants in this genus generally require a position in full sun or part day shade, and a fertile well-drained soil. The desert lantern can be in flower for much of the year.

A fibre was obtained from the stem bark by the Aborigines, but it is unknown if the plant is still utilized today.

Habitat
Semi-arid districts; on red sandy soils, sand rises and dunes.

Occurs on sandplains and low sandy rises, dunefields, fertile alluvial plains, Mulga-dominated red earth plains, intermittent watercourses and run-on areas, and rocky or gravelly ranges, hills or rises composed of neutral or acidic rocks.

Aboriginal language names
Alyawarr: akeley-akeley, anteyterrk, arlpart, aylpart 
Anmatyerr: akeley-akeley 
Pintupi Luritja: tatji-tatji
Pitjantjatjara: tjirin-tjirinpa
Warlpiri: jinka-jinka, taji-taji

Ethnobotany

Alyawarr: food; water sources. 
Anmatyerr: material and culture: firewood, toys; weapons and implements: spears. Pintupi Luritja: food: fruit flesh. 
Pitjantjatjara: food: fruit flesh, gum, others, plant foods for animals; material and culture: others, shade or shelter, toys; weapons and implements: fish-poisons and traps. 
Warlpiri: food: plant foods for animals; material and culture: shade or shelter; weapons and implements: fish-poisons and traps.

References

otocarpum
Flora of Australia
Taxa named by Ferdinand von Mueller